Chueang is the legendary hero of the Dai people who ruled as first king of the Lü Kingdom establishing a capital at Jinghong.

Reign

Chueang established the Mueang Ho Kham Chiang Rung. Contemporary sources state that after ascending the throne, Chueang led an army to attack and occupy Muang Thaeng, which indicates that he would also have attacked Chiang Tung, the capital seat of the Tai Khoen kingdom. In Chinese Chueang is known as Pa Zhen (叭真). 

The kingdom did not last but formed the base of the Moeng Lü (1180-1950).

Wat Thammikaraja

Located in front of the Ayutthaya Royal Palace, Wat Thammikaraja was established by Chueang, the son in law of King Sainam Phung before the Ayutthaya Period.
 
The temple was originally known as Wat Mukkharat, and the name was later changed to honour of the founder. Although once large and grand, today’s temple is somewhat diminished. However, there are many important formations inside Wat Thammikaraja.
 
The focus point of Wat Thammikaraja is a roofless viharn, with ten brick pillars. Inside the temple you will discover a topless chedi surrounded by Angkorian style stucco lions, many which are in good condition, although some of their heads have been chopped off.
 
There is no charge to enter Wat Thammikaraja.

Plain of Jars

According to a local legend, the warrior king of Chueang brought his army from Southern China and defeated the evil chieftain, King Anga. The mighty battle was followed by a mighty feast, at which hundreds of gigantic jars of wine were consumed. Chueang was apparently, as bad at tidying up as he was good at throwing parties, for he left behind all of the empty jars, of which nearly three hundred remain, scattered around the flat plains, including his own victory cup. There is little physical evidence to say that this fanciful legend does not hold at least a little truth. Major wars have been fought on the plains over the centuries, as Lao, Siamese and Vietnamese armies attempted to win control of them. 

Another local tradition states the jars were molded, using natural materials such as clay, sand, sugar, and animal products in a type of stone mix. This led the locals to believe the cave at Site 1 was actually a kiln, and that the huge jars were fired there and are not actually of stone.

Death
Later on, his enemy sent two of his soldiers to seek help from Khun Lo of the Kingdom of Sip Song Chau Tai. Upon arrival Khun Lo led his army to fight a bloody battle against Chueang and his troops. Chueang was killed on the battlefield in 1192.

Legacy

Chueang had extended his territory far and wide, encompassing Chiang Rung, Chiang Tung, Guangdong, Guangxi, Muang Kaeo, Muang Puan, Muang Sua,  Shan and Lavo. As a consequence, these cities rulers claimed Chueang as their ancestor.

Khun Chomtham brought his people and built the city of Phayao in the beginning of 11th century A.D. and enjoyed independence up until the late 13th century A.D. when Phayao had been annexed to Lanna Kingdom.

Phaya Lao Meng married Nang Thep Kham Khai and had one son named Mangrai, who is the first king of Mangrai Dynasty and found Chiang Mai and moved the center of political power and development from Ngoen Yang Chiang Saen to Chiang Mai.

Modern culture

Chueang appears in various versions of the Phra Ruang myth. Phra Ruang, the City Father of Lavo, then a subject of the Khmer king, was obliged to send water-tribute to Angkor. Instead of using normal jars, he devised big baskets to hold a large amount of water. Later Phra Ruang escaped to Sukhothai and ordained as a monk. The Khmer king sent a warrior after him. The Khmer warrior travelled underground and emerged at the temple where Phra Ruang was sweeping the ground. Upon seeing the monk and not knowing Phra Ruang, the Khmer warrior asked where he could find Phra Ruang. Phra Ruang told him to wait for a minute. He then turned the Khmer warrior into stone.

Descendants
 Mangrai the Great, the first King of Chiang Mai 
 Ngam Muang, the king of Phayao
 Ram Khamhaeng the Great, the third king of the Phra Ruang dynasty

See also 
 Luang Prabang Province
 Muang Sua
 Phayao Province
 Plain of Jars

References

1125 births
1192 deaths
Converts to Buddhism
Buddhist monarchs
History of Laos
Tai history
Dai people
12th-century Tai people